The 1920 Montana State Bobcats football team was an American football team that represented Montana State College (later renamed Montana State University) in the Rocky Mountain Conference (RMC) during the 1920 college football season. In its first season under head coach D. V. Graves, the team compiled a 4–1–1 record (0–0–1 against RMC opponents) and outscored all opponents by a total of 62 to 41.

Schedule

References

Montana State
Montana State Bobcats football seasons
Montana State Bobcats football